"Button Off My Shirt" is a song written by Billy Livsey and Graham Lyle, and recorded by American country music singer Ronnie Milsap. It released in July 1988 as the fifth single from the album Heart & Soul.  It peaked at number four on the Hot Country Songs charts.

Content
The song talks of an ended relationship, where the narrator compares his former lover to a missing button from his shirt – "just an everyday distraction" which "some day he will replace".

Cover versions
Another version was released in 1988 by British singer Paul Carrack, from the album One Good Reason. This version peaked at number 91 on the Billboard Hot 100.

Charts

Ronnie Milsap

Weekly charts

Year-end charts

Paul Carrack

References

1988 singles
1987 songs
Paul Carrack songs
Ronnie Milsap songs
Songs written by Graham Lyle
Songs written by Billy Livsey
RCA Records singles